The European Agency for Special Needs and Inclusive Education is an independent organisation that acts as a platform for collaboration for its 31 member countries, working towards ensuring more inclusive education systems. The Agency's mission is to help member countries improve the quality and effectiveness of their inclusive provision for all learners.

All European countries are committed to working towards ensuring more inclusive education systems. They do so in different ways, depending on their past and current contexts and histories. Inclusive education systems are seen as a vital component within the wider aspiration of more socially inclusive societies that all countries align themselves with, both ethically and politically.

The ultimate vision for inclusive education systems is "to ensure that all learners of any age are provided with meaningful, high-quality educational opportunities in their local community, alongside their friends and peers". This vision is depicted in an animation video.

The Agency has a mandate from its member countries to facilitate collaboration regarding country priorities that are in line with the European Council priorities as identified in the European Education Area. Agency activities take into consideration key international statements on inclusive education, such as the United Nations Sustainable Development Goal 4, the Education 2030: Incheon declaration and Framework for Action for the implementation of  Sustainable Development Goal 4, the Convention on the Rights of the Child, the United Nations Convention on the Rights of Persons with Disabilities, the Salamanca Statement, the Cali commitment to equity and inclusion in education, and the 2021 UNESCO regional Global Education Monitoring Report on Inclusion and Education: All means all.

The Agency was established in 1996 as an initiative of the Danish Government. The Agency Secretariat is based in Odense, Denmark and the Agency has an office in Brussels, Belgium.

Through its activities the Agency facilitates the collection, processing and transfer of European level and country specific information in the area of inclusive education, and it provides opportunities for sharing different types of knowledge and experiences.

Members
At present the Agency has 31 member countries: Austria, Belgium (Flemish, French and German communities), Bulgaria, Croatia, Cyprus, Czech Republic, Denmark, Estonia, Finland, France, Germany, Greece, Hungary, Iceland, Ireland, Italy Latvia, Lithuania, Luxembourg, Malta, Netherlands, Norway, Poland, Portugal, Serbia, Slovak Republic, Slovenia, Spain, Sweden, Switzerland, United Kingdom (England, Northern Ireland, Scotland and Wales).

Activities
The main focus of the Agency's work is upon inclusive education and the characteristics of provision for all learners, in particular those who are vulnerable to marginalisation and exclusion, such as students with disabilities and/or special educational needs.

By analysing and identifying key factors that hinder or support positive developments, the Agency provides member countries with recommendations and guidelines for policy and practice and then shares information about the reality of inclusive education across Europe.

In its activities, the Agency focuses on priorities established by member countries within the framework of its annual and multi-annual work programmes. Annual reports presenting an overview of annual activities are available online.

Ongoing Activities
Country Policy Review and Analysis (CPRA) (2013 - ongoing)
The goal of this ongoing activity is to aid country reflection regarding the development of policy for inclusive education. It has been developed to provide a new form of individualised country information.

Data collection in the framework of the European Agency Statistics on Inclusive Education (EASIE) (2012 - ongoing)
This is an ongoing data collection activity presenting quantitative and qualitative country information.

The Agency acts as a technical body for countries who want to improve their inclusive education systems. In the framework of the European Commission's Technical Support Instrument programme, as of 2018, the Agency has been assisting its member countries with the preparation and implementation of reforms to improve their inclusive education systems.

Thematic activities
All thematic activities focus upon issues of common concern for policy makers for special needs and inclusive education. The topics to be examined within thematic activities are identified via a systemic collection of information on the priorities countries have.

Priority topics include early childhood intervention, assessment in inclusive settings, teacher education for inclusion, vocational education and training, ICT for inclusion, information accessibility and data collection in the field of special needs education.

This is a list of Agency activities categorised under thematic sub-groups:

Cross-cutting messages
Voices into Action (VIA): Including the Voices of Learners and their Families in Future Agency Work (2021-2022)
Building Resilience through Inclusive Education Systems (BRIES) (2021-2024)
Preventing School Failure (PSF): Examining the Potential of Inclusive Education Policies in Relation to the System and Individuals (2018-2020)
Supporting Inclusive School Leadership (2017-2021)
Changing Role of Specialist Provision in Supporting Inclusive Education (2017-2022). This project is described in a public-facing video released in 2021
Inclusive Education in Action (IEA) (2009-2010; 2018) in co-operation with UNESCO
Evidence of the effects of inclusive education in supporting social inclusion (2016-2017)
Early School Leaving and Learners with Disabilities and/or Special Educational Needs (2016)
Financing Policies for Inclusive Education Systems (2016-2018)
Financing of Inclusive Education (2014-2015)
Special Needs Education in Europe (Vol. 2) – provision in post-primary education (2006)
Special Education across Europe 2003 (2002-2003)
Special Needs Education in Europe (2002)
Financing of Special Needs Education (1997-2000)
Integration in Europe (1997-1998)

Pre-school education
Inclusive Early Childhood Education (IECE) (2015-2017)
Early Childhood Intervention (ECI) (2003-2005) and (2009-2010)
Early Intervention in Europe (1997-2000)

Compulsory education sector
Teacher Professional Learning for Inclusion (2018-2022)
Raising the Achievement of all Learners in Inclusive Education (2014-2016)
Raising Achievement for All Learners – Quality in Inclusive Education (RA4AL) (2011-2012)
Organisation of Provision to Support Inclusive Education (2012-2014)
Teacher Education for Inclusion (2009-2012)
Mapping the Implementation of Policy for Inclusive education (MIPIE) (2010-2011)
Inclusive Education in Classroom Practice Indicators – Follow up project (2009-2010)
Indicators for Inclusive Education (2008)
Assessment in Inclusive settings (2005-2006) and (2006-2008)
Multicultural Diversity and Special Needs Education (2006-2008) 
Inclusive Education and Classroom Practice in Secondary Education (2003-2004) 
Inclusive Education and Classroom Practice in Primary Education (1999-2002)
Teacher Support (1997-2000)

Post-compulsory education
Vocational Education and Training (2010-2012)
Higher Education Accessibility Guide (HEAG) (2001-2002) and (2009-2010)
Individual Transition Plans (2003-2005)
Transition from School to Employment (1999-2002)

Information and Communication Technology
Inclusive Digital Education (2021-2022)in collaboration with the Institut für Technologie und Arbeit
ICT for Information Accessibility in Learning (ICT4IAL) (2013-2015) in co-operation with European Schoolnet, the International Association of Universities, UNESCO, the DAISY Consortium and the Global Initiative of Inclusive ICTs
ICT for Inclusion (2012-2013)
Accessible Information Provision for Lifelong Learning (i-access) (2011-2012) 
ICTs in Education for People with Disabilities (2010-2011) in co-operation with UNESCO Institute for Information Technologies in Education/IITE 
Information Society Technologies and Special Educational Needs-NET (SEN-IST-NET) (2001-2004)
ICT and Special Needs Education (1999-2001)

Key Principles
The Key Principles publications systematically present recurring messages in Agency work that support the implementation of high-quality education for all learners. An informative video was created to accompany the 2021 Key Principles publication.
Key Principles – Supporting policy development and implementation for inclusive education (2021)
Key Principles for Promoting Quality in Inclusive Education – Recommendations for Practice (2010-2011)
Key Principles for Promoting Quality in Inclusive Education – Recommendations for Policy Makers (2009) 
Key Principles for Special Needs Education – Recommendations for Policy Makers (2002-2003)

Information provision
Information from Agency project activities is summarised on the website in various formats such as final project reports, summary flyers, country reports and study visit reports, videos, PPTs, etc. Main project outcomes are translated in all the Agency official languages, a total of 25 languages. In 2020, the Agency adopted an Open Access Policy to maximise the reach and impact of Agency outputs. This policy affirms the Agency’s commitment to providing resources and tools for all relevant stakeholders, including educational policy-makers, researchers, school leaders, teachers, learners and families. The policy also clarifies usage and modification rights of Agency resources. All materials on the Agency website are free to download.

Detailed information on each Agency member country's legal system, financing, systems of support and specialist provision, teacher education for inclusion, etc. is summarised in the Country information section  of the Agency website.

Events
In addition to thematic projects, the Agency organises special events, dissemination conferences, round table discussions, thematic sessions and other events. These events are an opportunity to raise awareness, share information on priority areas and facilitate networking for participants.

Two of the four Parliament Hearings for young people took place in the European Parliament in 2003 and in 2011, and one in the Portuguese Parliament in 2007. The last Hearing from October 2015 entitled ‘Inclusive Education: Take Action! Luxembourg Recommendations’ was an official event of the Luxembourg Presidency of the European Union.

These events were organised for young people with and without disabilities in order to provide them an opportunity to express their views about inclusive education and to reach policy-makers. Results from the Hearings have been presented to key decision makers at both national and European levels for their consideration and further action.

History

1996–2001
The Agency was established in 1996 as an initiative of the Danish Government, endorsed by the member states’ Education Ministers. The establishment of the Agency took place at the end of the European Commission's Helios II programme  
and reflected the need for a permanent and systematic structure for European collaboration in the field of special needs and inclusive education.

In 1999, following a three-year trial period funded by the Danish education authorities, the Agency was transferred to the member states. This formally established the Agency as a European organisation with the mandate to act as its member states’ platform for collaboration in the field of special needs and inclusive education.
In 1999 another Agency office was established in Brussels.

Between 1997 and 2001 the Agency's work focused on creating a platform for co-operation at European level through the national networks built up in all countries. During this period, the European Commission supported concrete activities aimed at analysing and disseminating key information in the field of special needs education across Europe.

2002–2006

By this time the work was focused on firmly consolidating and strengthening the Agency's position as the platform for co-operation at European level. Co-operation activities took place with European and international organisations. The Agency website was expanded and national networks were extended in all countries through the involvement of nominated national experts participating in the Agency projects.

The Agency benefited from an operating grant from 2002 until 2004. In 2004, the Agency was included in the Decision No 791/2004/EC of the European Parliament and of the Council, this decision provided a legal basis for the Agency and ensured the provision of an operating grant until 2006.

Since 2007
The Agency now has 31 member countries. The newest members are Bulgaria and Serbia, who joined in 2017 and 2018.

Since 2007 the Agency has been one of six European institutions supported with an operating grant under the Jean Monnet initiative within the EU Lifelong Learning Programme 2007–2013 and similarly under the Jean Monnet initiative within the European Union Erasmus+ education programme.

In terms of thinking, implementation and language usage, the concept ‘special needs education’ has shifted towards ‘inclusive education’. Similarly, the way of thinking about learners’ needs has moved from the concept of ‘special educational needs’ towards ‘additional needs’ and the Agency's work is focused on improving education systems to accommodate the needs of all learners.

The Agency's original name was European Agency for Development in Special Needs Education. The current name – European Agency for Special Needs and Inclusive Education – formally came into effect as of 1 January 2014 to better reflect the Agency's current and future activities.

2019
The 2019 Council Recommendation on High Quality Early Childhood Education and Care Systems  includes clear advice to use the Agency as a resource. It says: ‘Promote transparent and coherent monitoring and evaluation of early childhood education and care services at the appropriate levels with a view to policy development and implementation. Effective approaches could include ... implementing existing tools to improve the inclusiveness of early childhood education and care provision such as the Inclusive Early Childhood Education Learning Environment Self-Reflection Tool  developed by the European Agency for Special Needs and Inclusive Education.'

2021
In 2021 the Agency celebrated its 25th anniversary with the publication of a reflective book, Celebrating 25 years on the path to inclusive education.

Co-operative relationships
The Agency maintains active working relationships with other specialist European organisations  working in the field of inclusive and special needs education as well as with key international bodies and organisations in the education sector, such as UNESCO and its institutes (International Bureau of Education /IBE, and International Institute for Information Technologies in Education/ITTE), the UNICEF CEE/CIS regional office,  the OECD, the International Labour Organization and the World Bank.

References

External links

Institutions supported by the Jean Monnet Programme
Inclusive Education in Action online resource
ICT for Information Accessibility in Learning project page
Erasmus+ the new EU programme for Education, Training, Youth and Sport for 2014-2020
The Agency's YouTube channel
Subscribe to the eBulletin - the Agency's newsletter
 This short animation video explains how the Agency works with its member countries.
European disability organizations
International organizations based in Europe
International educational organizations
Educational policies and initiatives of the European Union